Phytoecia pici is a species of beetle in the family Cerambycidae. It was described by Edmund Reitter in 1892. It is known from Iraq, Iran, and possibly also Turkey.

References

Phytoecia
Beetles described in 1892